Ayatollah Sayyid Murtadha al-Hussaini al-Shirazi (b. 1964) is a Shia mujtahid and author. He is the second son of late grand Ayatollah Sayyid Muhammad al-Shirazi. He teaches a number of higher level classes in Islamic law, legal theory and Quranic exegesis at the religious seminary of Najaf, Iraq.

Biography
al-Shirazi was born in Karbala, Iraq in 1964. His family had produced scholars and marjas, including Mirza Hassan Shirazi, leader of the constitutional, also known as the Tobacco Movement in Iran, Grand Ayatollah Muhammad Taqi Shirazi, leader of the 1920 revolution in Iraq, which liberated Iraq from colonial powers, and his father Grand Ayatollah Mohamad Shirazi. 

In 1995 Shirazi was imprisoned for 18 months after which he "reportedly escaped to Syria and has requested political asylum."

He has written a number of books in Arabic with some of his works translated in English.

References

List of his books 

 Economic Success: Practical Strategies for Producing Wealth and Combating Poverty in the System of Imam Ali
 A Commentary of the Quranic Verse of the Divine Authority of Imam Ali: and his infallible progeny

See also
Sadiq Hussaini Shirazi

Iraqi ayatollahs
Iraqi religious leaders
1964 births
Living people
Iraqi people of Iranian descent